The common walkingstick or northern walkingstick (Diapheromera femorata) is a species of phasmid or stick insect found across North America. The average length of this species is 75mm (3 in) for males and 95mm (3.7 in) for females.

The insect is found in deciduous forest throughout North America, where it eats many types of plant foliage. Even though the common walkingstick is a generalist it does tend to prefer foliage from oak and hazelnut trees. Localised clusters of these insects sometimes occur; however, the insects have no wings, and dispersal from tree to tree is limited.

Description

The common walkingstick is a slender, elongated insect that camouflages itself by resembling a twig. There are three pairs of legs, but at rest, the front pair is extended forward beside the antennae, forming an extension of the twig-like effect. Neither sex has wings, the antennae are two thirds of the length of the body, and each of the cerci (paired appendages at the tip of the abdomen) has a single segment.

Diapheromera femorata (Say, 1824), Found in Milledgeville, Ga. on September 22nd, 2022 at Lockerly Arboretum.

Distribution
This walkingstick is native to North America. Its range extends from the Atlantic coast from Maine to Florida, as far west as California and northwards to North Dakota. It also occurs in Canada (where it is the only stick insect) being present in Alberta, Manitoba, Ontario and Québec.

Ecology
D. femorata is herbivorous, feeding mainly on the leaves of trees. They are leaf skeletonisers, eating the tissues between the leaf veins, pausing for a while and then walking on to new leaves. They can feed at any time of day but the greatest feeding activity has been noted between 9pm and 3am. Early-stage nymphs are often found on American hazel (Corylus americana) and black cherry (Prunus serotina), but where these are scarce, they are likely to be on white oak (Quercus alba). Older individuals may choose black oak (Quercus velutina). Another food tree is the black locust (Robinia pseudoacacia). Adults are present in August and September in the northern part of the range, but because of their tendency to feed high in the canopy, the insects are seldom seen.

The stick insect life cycle is hemimetabolous, proceeding through a series of nymphal stages. Breeding takes place in late summer after the nymph has moulted for the last time and become an adult. Here they overwinter in the leaf litter, hatching the following May or even a year later. If conditions are dry, the newly hatched young may fail to extricate themselves from their egg-capsules. Ones that succeed in doing so climb up the trunks of trees, start to feed on the foliage, and pass through four to six moults as they grow.

References

External links

Phasmatodea
Insects of North America
Insects described in 1824